The 52nd Okan began on 16 December 2010. The winner of the challenger tournament will face last years Okan champion Yamashiro Hiroshi.

Tournament

Final

References

2011 in go
Go competitions in Japan